The men's C-2 1000 metres event was an open-style, pairs canoeing event conducted as part of the Canoeing at the 1964 Summer Olympics programme on Lake Sagami, Japan.

The preliminary heats were held on 20 October 1964; 12 crews entered and were split into two heats of 6 pairs each.  The top three placers in each heat advanced to the final, while the remaining six crews had to compete in a semifinal held the next day.  The 3 slowest canoeists were eliminated in the semifinal on 21 October, with the top 3 joining the initial 6 finalists.  The final was held on 22 October.

Medalists

Results

Heats

The 12 teams first raced in two heats on 20 October.  The top three finishers from each of the heats advanced directly to the final and the remaining 6 teams were relegated to the semifinal.

Semifinal

The top three finishers in the semifinal (raced on 21 October) advanced to the final, joining the six teams who had moved directly from the heats.  All other teams were eliminated.

Final

The final was held on 22 October.  All three medallists, and even the fourth-place finishers, came from the first heat.

References
1964 Summer Olympics official report Volume 2, Part 1. pp. 250–1.
Sports-reference.com 1964 C-2 1000 m results.

Men's C-2 1000
Men's events at the 1964 Summer Olympics